The Victory Shield is an annual football tournament competed for by the under-16 teams of Scotland, Republic of Ireland, Northern Ireland and Wales. The Victory Shield had traditionally been competed for by the four Home Nations, but the Football Association withdrew the England team from the tournament "for the foreseeable future" in 2015. The competition was continued after England's withdrawal, with the Republic of Ireland taking their place. The competition was competed by under-15 teams until 2001, when switching to under-16 to fall in line with UEFA competitions.

List of previous winners

Pre-War
Incomplete
1925 –

Post-War

1940s
1946–47                
1947–48                
1948–49                
1949–50

1950s
1950–51                ,  &  – joint champions
1951–52                
1952–53                
1953–54                
1954–55                
1955–56                
1956–57                
1957–58                
1958–59                
1959–60

1960s
1960–61                
1961–62                
1962–63                
1963–64                
1964–65                
1965–66                
1966–67                
1967–68                 &  – joint champions
1968–69                
1969–70

1970s
1970–71                
1971–72                
1972–73                
1973–74                
1974–75                
1975–76                
1976–77                
1977–78                 &  – joint champions
1978–79                
1979–80                 &  – joint champions

1980s
1980–81                 &  – joint champions
1981–82                
1982–83                 &  – joint champions
1983–84                
1984–85                
1985–86                 &  – joint champions
1986–87                
1987–88                
1988–89                
1989–90

1990s
1990–91                ,  &  – joint champions
1991–92                
1992–93                
1993–94                
1994–95                
1995–96                
1996–97                 &  – joint champions
1997–98                
1998–99                
1999–2000

2000s
2000–01 
2001–02 
2002–03 
2003–04  &  – joint champions
2004–05 
2005–06  &  – joint champions
2006–07 
2007–08 
2008–09 
2009–10

2010s
2010–11 
2011–12 
2012–13 
2013–14 
2014–15 
2015–16 
2016–17 
2017–18 
2018–19 
2019–20  &  – joint champions
2020-21 | Not Played
2021-22   &  – joint champions

Overall winners since World War II

 – 38 (outright winners)
 – 17 (outright winners)
 – 3 (outright winners)
 – 1 (outright winners)
 – 2 (outright winners)
 and  – 8 (shared)
,  and  – 2 (shared)
 and  – 2 (shared)
 and  – 2 (shared)

References

External links

 
International association football competitions hosted by England
International association football competitions hosted by Scotland
International association football competitions hosted by Wales
International association football competitions hosted by Northern Ireland
Youth association football competitions for international teams